Warwick Thornton (born 1970) is an Australian film director, screenwriter and cinematographer. His debut feature film Samson and Delilah won the Caméra d'Or at the 2009 Cannes Film Festival and the award for Best Film at the Asia Pacific Screen Awards. He also won the Asia Pacific Screen Award for Best Film in 2017 for Sweet Country.

Early life and education
Thornton is a Kaytetye man born and raised in Alice Springs. His mother Freda Glynn co-founded and was the first director of the Central Australian Aboriginal Media Association (CAAMA) and was the director of Imparja Television for its first 10 years.

At 13, Thornton was sent to school in Australia's only monastic town, New Norcia, Western Australia, although he later declared he became angry with Christianity and did not consider himself religious.

He graduated in cinematography from the Australian Film, Television and Radio School.

Career
Thornton began his career making short films and has achieved success with them at film festivals around the world, including Payback at the Telluride Film Festival and Green Bush and Nana at the Berlin International Film Festival. He describes his decision to become a filmmaker in an interview in 2007:

Where I grew up in Alice I was a DJ for a radio station (CAAMA). The station began a film unit and so I watched people pack cameras and equipment into cars and take off to make films. I was alone at the radio station and I thought that I really wanted to go with them. That's how it started, I made a film called Green Bush which is basically about that time. Eventually I went to AFTRS in Sydney and got really involved as a Director of Photography. I’ve been in the business for 9 years now.

Thornton shared a personal as well as professional relationship with Beck Cole, and along with producer Kath Shelper called themselves "the trinity", working together from 2004.

In 2009 Thornton wrote, directed and shot his first feature film Samson & Delilah, which won awards including the Camera d’Or for best first feature film at the 2009 Cannes Film Festival. The following year he filmed the documentary series Art + Soul about Aboriginal and Torres Strait Islander artists, which was written and narrated by curator Hetti Perkins. The installation Mother Courage (inspired by Bertolt Brecht's 1939 character) was commissioned by dOCUMENTA and ACMI, and first exhibited in 2012.

Awards and nominations

Family and personal life

Thornton's sister, Erica Glynn, is also a film writer and director.

Thornton was formerly married to filmmaker Beck Cole, whom he met in 1999. They have a daughter, Luka May, an actress also known as Luka Magdeline Cole or Luka May Glynn-Cole. The couple shared a personal as well as professional relationship (see above). By 2018 Thornton and Cole had separated.

Thornton also has a son, Dylan River, who is a filmmaker who has worked with his father, and another daughter, Rona, from an earlier relationship.

Filmography

As director
 From Sand to Celluloid – Payback (1996), Blackfella Films, short film, also writer
 Willigan's Fitzroy (2000), documentary, also writer
 Mimi (2002) Blackfella Films, short film, also director, starring Aaron Pedersen and Sophie Lee
 Green Bush (2005), short film, also writer, starring David Page, produced by CAAMA Productions
 The Old Man and the Inland Sea (2005), documentary, also writer
 Burning Daylight (2007), documentary
 Dark Science (2007), documentary, co-director
 Nana (2007), short film
 Samson and Delilah (2009)
 Art + Soul (2010)
 The Darkside (2013)
 Words With Gods (2014)
 We Don't Need a Map (2017), documentary
 Sweet Country (2017)
 Mystery Road (TV series) Series 2. (2020)
  The Beach (2020) - TV documentary series about himself in isolation on a beach on the remote Dampier Peninsula

As cinematographer
 Marn Grook: An Aboriginal Perspective on Australian Rules Football (1997), documentary
 Radiance (1998), feature film, directed by Rachel Perkins)
 Buried Country (2000), documentary, directed by Andy Nehl, based on the book by Clinton Walker
 Ngangkari Way (2001), documentary, directed by Erica Glynn
 Flat (2001), short film, directed by Beck Cole
 Mimi (2001), short film, directed by Warwick Thornton
 Kurtal: Snake Spirit (2002), documentary, co-cinematographer
 Queen of Hearts (2003), directed by Danielle MacLean
 Wirriya: Small Boy (2004), documentary, co-cinematographer, directed by Beck Cole
 Five Seasons (2005), documentary, directed by Steven McGregor
 The Lore of Love (2005), documentary, directed by Beck Cole
 My Brother Vinnie (2006), documentary, directed by Steven McGregor
 Plains Empty  (2006), short film, directed by Beck Cole
 Green Bush (2006), short film, directed by Warwick Thornton
 First Australians (2006), television series, directed by Beck Cole & Rachel Perkins
 Samson & Delilah (2009), feature film, directed by Warwick Thornton
 Here I Am (2011), feature film, directed by Beck Cole
 The Sapphires (2012), feature film, directed by Wayne Blair
 Sweet Country (2017), directed by Warwick Thornton

References

Further reading

 Book review and extract.

External links 
 
 Interview with Warwick Thornton

Australian film directors
Australian cinematographers
Living people
People from Alice Springs
Indigenous Australian filmmakers
Directors of Caméra d'Or winners
1970 births